The 1952 All-Ireland Senior Football Championship was the 66th staging of Ireland's premier Gaelic football knock-out competition.

Limerick play in their last Munster championship game until 1965.

In the Connacht final Roscommon ended Mayo's 2 year spell as All Ireland champions. 

Cavan won their fifth, and so far last, All-Ireland title.

Results

Connacht Senior Football Championship

Note it was the smallest Connacht championship until 2020. Leitrim were not part of the championship.

Leinster Senior Football Championship

Munster Senior Football Championship

Ulster Senior Football Championship

All-Ireland Senior Football Championship

Championship statistics

Miscellaneous

 Fr. O'Hara Park, Charlestown opens in honour of Father Eddie O'Hara.
 Limerick are dropped from the Munster football championship until 1965.
 Smallest Connacht championship until 2020. 
 The All Ireland semi-final between Meath and Roscommon was the first meeting between the teams.
 The All-Ireland final ends in a draw and goes to a replay for the first time since 1946.

References

All-Ireland Senior Football Championship